The Ides of March (the "middle of March") is the 15th day of the Roman month of Martius.

Ides of March or The Ides of March may also refer to:

 Ides of March coin a coin celebrating the assassination of Julius Caesar
 The Ides of March (novel), a 1948 novel by Thornton Wilder
 "The Ides of March" (short story), an 1898 short story by E. W. Hornung in The Amateur Cracksman
 The Ides of March (2011 film), a 2011 film by George Clooney
 The Ides of March (1961 film), a 1961 Australian TV play
 The Ides of March (band), American rock band that had a major hit with the song "Vehicle" in 1970 
 "The Ides of March", a 1981 instrumental by Iron Maiden from Killers
 "The Ides of March", a 2005 song by Silverstein from Discovering the Waterfront
 "Ides of March", a 1971 instrumental by John Cale and Terry Riley from Church of Anthrax
 "The Ides of March", an episode of Xena: Warrior Princess
 "The Ides of March", an episode of Party of Five
 The Ides of March (album), by Myles Kennedy

See also
 Assassination of Julius Caesar
 March 15

Date and time disambiguation pages